Drag is a 1929 American Pre-Code drama film produced by  Richard A. Rowland and directed by Frank Lloyd based on the 1925 novel Drag: A Comedy by William Dudley Pelley. It stars Richard Barthelmess and  Lucien Littlefield.

Plot
Young David Carroll takes over the publication of a local newspaper in Vermont. Although he is attracted to Dot, "the most sophisticated girl in town," he marries Allie Parker, daughter of the couple who run the boardinghouse where he lives. Allie remains at home when David goes to New York City to sell a musical he has written. There, Dot, now a successful costume designer, uses her influence to get David's play produced. David and Dot fall in love, but she leaves for Paris when David indicates he will remain true to Allie. He sends for Allie, but when she arrives with her whole family, he decides to follow Dot to Paris.

Cast
 Richard Barthelmess as David Carroll
 Lucien Littlefield as Pa Parker
 Kathrin Clare Ward as Ma Parker
 Alice Day as Allie Parker
 Tom Dugan as Charlie Parker
 Lila Lee as Dot
 Margaret Fielding as Clara

Awards and honors
Frank Lloyd was nominated at the 2nd Academy Awards for Academy Award for Best Director along with the film Weary River.

Preservation status
The film was long thought to be a lost film but later was rediscovered. The film originally had two versions, a sound version and a silent version.

See also
 List of rediscovered films
 List of early Warner Bros. talking features

References

External links
 
 

1929 films
1929 drama films
Films directed by Frank Lloyd
American black-and-white films
First National Pictures films
Films based on American novels
Films based on works by William Dudley Pelley
1920s rediscovered films
Rediscovered American films
1920s English-language films
1920s American films